The Helan Shan pika or silver pika (Ochotona argentata) is a species of mammal in the pika family, Ochotonidae. It is endemic to China where it is found in a small region of the Helan Mountains. It is listed as "Endangered" in the IUCN Red List of Threatened Species as of 2016.

Description
Like other pikas, the Helan Shan pika has long, soft grayish-brown fur. It is related to rabbits and hares but unlike those animals, the limbs are all about the same length. The ears are small and rounded and the feet are covered with fur.

Distribution and habitat
The Helan Shan pika is known only from the Helan Mountains in the Inner Mongolian Autonomous Region of China which lie between the semi-arid Ordos Desert and the Yellow River Valley to the east and the Badain Jaran Desert to the west. Upland areas are clad in coniferous forests of dragon spruce (Picea asperata) with a lower layer of birch (Betula spp.) and poplar (Populus spp.). On the more exposed, open slopes, scrub species include the Manchu rose (Rosa xanthina), Caragana spp., the Gansu elm (Ulmus glaucescens), the hazel-hornbeam (Ostryopsis davidiana), the yellowhorn (Xanthoceras sorbifolia) and the temple juniper (Juniperus rigida).

Biology
The Helan Shan pika lives among boulders and scree and makes its home deep in the crevices between stones. It is a herbivore and feeds on grass and other vegetation which it gathers in meadow areas adjoining the scree. It does not hibernate and, to help provide for the winter when food is scarce, it makes "haypiles" of dried grass and foliage during the summer and stores them underground.

Status
Its population size is unknown but is likely to be decreasing as a result of logging activities within its range resulting in loss of habitat. It cannot tolerate high temperatures and any warming of the climate is likely to have negative impacts on the species. For these reasons, the IUCN in its Red List of Threatened Species lists this animal as being "Endangered".

See also
List of endangered and protected species of China

References

Pikas
Endemic fauna of China
Mammals of China
Endangered fauna of Asia
Mammals described in 1928
Taxonomy articles created by Polbot
Endangered Fauna of China